Jacques d'Imecourt was a French sports shooter. He competed in the trap event at the 1924 Summer Olympics.

References

External links
 

Year of birth missing
Year of death missing
French male sport shooters
Olympic shooters of France
Shooters at the 1924 Summer Olympics
Place of birth missing